Katherine Brooks (born March 15, 1976) is an American film writer and director. Brooks is a member of the Directors Guild of America, a Jury Member for Samsung Fresh-Films 2007 (the largest teen filmmaking program in the USA) and is the recipient of the LACE Award for Arts and Entertainment. In 2011, she was named one of the "Amazing Gay Women in Showbiz" by POWER UP.

Career

Brooks has directed 21 television shows, as well as written and directed 10 films. Her film and television credits include three seasons of the Emmy Award winning show The Osbournes, Newlyweds: Nick and Jessica, and MTV's groundbreaking The Real World. While associated with MTV, she helmed the network's There and Back, with Ashley Parker Angel and Tiffany Lynn, Meet the Barkers with Blink 182 drummer Travis Barker, and directed and produced The Simple Life starring Paris Hilton and Nicole Richie.

Brooks moved into directing feature films after making her short films Finding Kate and Dear Emily.

Brooks's first feature film, Loving Annabelle, which Brooks wrote and directed, stars Erin Kelly, Diane Gaidry and Kevin McCarthy. It debuted at the prestigious Cinequest Film Festival in 2006. The film won the Audience Award and Best Actress Award at Outfest. In addition, Loving Annabelle won Best Feature Film at Melbourne Film Festival (2006), Barcelona Film Festival (2006), Atlanta Film Festival (2006), and the Jury Award at Paris Cinema Festival (2006).

Brooks wrote her second feature, the indie thriller Waking Madison, in New Orleans, a film which stars Sarah Roemer (Disturbia), Elisabeth Shue, Will Patton, Frances Conroy, and Taryn Manning. The film explores the journey of a young woman suffering from multiple personality disorder. Her documentary Face 2 Face appeared in Netflix in 2013. Katherine was a Field Producer on the National Geographic show "Impact" produced by Gal Gadot.

Her most recent work is Lost in Time (2018), starring Jill Hennessy.

Personal life
Brooks is a spokesperson for PETA and a practicing Buddhist. Brooks lives in New Orleans, Louisiana.

Films

Finding Kate 
In 2004, Erin Kelly and Brooks made an experimental short film called Finding Kate. The short film was part of a series called Virgin Memoirs, a compilation which narrated the "first time" experiences of women.

A young Kelly plays 17-year-old Kate at a wedding reception. When she sees Victoria (Jessica Lancaster), she quickly drops her boyfriend's hand to go and talk to her cousin. The two flirt and end up in the pool together, their eyes dancing until they begin to kiss.

Dear Emily 
Sara is going to visit her high school friend Emily. On her journey there, she recalls her last experience with her teenage crush, remembering a letter that she wrote Emily—a letter confessing her love for her. Following a painful flashback to Emily's mocking of Sara after she reads the note, she decides to keep on driving to her destination. Dear Emily was funded by EVEO.com after Brooks won a pitch contest for her feature film, Loving Annabelle. Despite being given only 6 weeks from conception to completion, and just $1,000 to make it, the film, to date, has made back over 500% of its profit.

Loving Annabelle 

Loving Annabelle is the controversial story of a Catholic boarding school teacher, Simone Bradley (Diane Gaidry), who has an affair with her female student, Annabelle (Erin Kelly).

The film was summed up by Variety magazine as a "Guilty Pleasure", and has won numerous awards on the festival circuit, including the Outfest Award for Best Actress, and the Outfest Award for the Audience Choice. The film sat in the top five list of videos rented by lesbians according to Wolfe Video's web site. It is recommended by 100% of readers on scene-OUT.com, and is ranked on the bestseller's list in its category on Amazon.

Waking Madison 

Waking Madison is the provocative story of a young woman's battle with mental illness.
 
Madison Walker (Sarah Roemer) is suffering of dissociative identity disorder or multiple personality disorder. Living in New Orleans and working as a sex phone operator, Madison is doing everything she can to lead a normal life.

When a series of events leaves Madison suicidal and desperate, she locks herself away in her apartment for 30 days. Using a video camera to document herself like a visual journal, Madison clearly states on her first entry that if she does not have the answers to her questions and feels more at people with her life on the 30th day, she will kill herself.

With the help of Doctor Elizabeth Barnes (Elisabeth Shue), Madison begins to slowly piece her life together. Determined to find a cure for herself, Madison hostages herself in her apartment for 30 days and embarks on a journey to discover: what is real? The climactic twist at the end leaves audiences with the very same question. Brooks stated:
I'm intrigued by the challenge of telling a story from the perspective of a character suffering from multiple personality disorder. Visually, Madison will take on an innovative style of mixing narrative with documentary- realism.

As part of research for the topic, Brooks locked herself up for 30 days and underwent the same process as the character Madison. This helped Brooks to visually re-create her experiences from the trial, bringing the character and the story more to life. Waking Madison was shot on location in New Orleans in Winter 2007.

Face 2 Face 

Brooks completed a documentary with the director doing a three-month summer trip around the country, meeting 50 of her Facebook friends who said yes when she posed the question as her status, "Who would like to spend a day with me and I'll come visit you". The idea was born after the director had a surgery, and despite having 4700 friends on Facebook, stated that she felt alone.

Filmography

Features 
 Lost In Time (2017) 
 The Boys Club (pre-production)
 Face 2 Face (2012)
 Waking Madison (2009)
 Loving Annabelle (2006)
  Surrender (2003)

Short films 
  Finding Kate (2004)
  Dear Emily (2001)
  Luna Butterflys (2000)
  Outtakes (1998)

Television 
  There & Back: Ashley Parker Angel (TV series) (2006)
  My Own (TV series) (2006)
  Meet the Barkers (TV series) (2005)
  Love is in the Heir (TV series) (2004)
  He's a Lady (TV series) (2004)
  Wanna Come In? (TV series) (2004)
  The Simple Life 2: Road Trip (TV series) (2004)
  Newlyweds: Nick & Jessica (TV series) (2003)
  The Real World: San Diego (TV series) (2003)
  The Osbournes (TV series) (2002)
  The Complex (TV series) (2002)
  Sexcetera (TV series) (1998)

See also
 List of female film and television directors
 List of lesbian filmmakers
 List of LGBT-related films directed by women

References

External links
 
 Katherine Brooks Interview 

1976 births
Living people
American documentary film directors
American television directors
American women screenwriters
American lesbian artists
American lesbian writers
LGBT film directors
American LGBT screenwriters
American women documentary filmmakers
American women television directors
Film directors from Louisiana
Screenwriters from Louisiana
LGBT people from Louisiana
People from Covington, Louisiana
Shorty Award winners
LGBT television directors
21st-century American women writers